Innocent Lugha Bashungwa (born May 5, 1979) is Minister of State in the President’s Office (Regional Administration and Local Government) in Tanzania. He previously served as Minister of Information, Culture, Arts and Sports and is a member of the Chama Cha Mapinduzi political party. He was elected MP representing Karagwe in 2015.

Political career
He was appointed Deputy Minister of Agriculture by President John Magufuli on 10 November 2018. On November 13, 2018, he was sworn in as Deputy Minister. In June 2019, Joseph Kakunda was replaced by Innocent Bashungwa as the minister of Industry, Trade and Investment, he went on to serve at this docket for a year before the parliament was dissolved on June 16, 2020.

In Magufuli's second cabinet, he was appointed as the Minister of Information, Culture, Artists and Sports. Following the January 2022 reshuffle of the Suluhu Cabinet, he assumed the position of the Minister of State in the President's Office.

References 

1978 births
Living people
Chama Cha Mapinduzi politicians
Tanzanian MPs 2015–2020
Tanzanian MPs 2020–2025
Tanzanian Roman Catholics